Glenea acuta is a species of beetle in the family Cerambycidae. It was described by Johan Christian Fabricius in 1801. It is known from Sumatra and Java.

Subspecies
 Glenea acuta acuta (Fabricius, 1801)
 Glenea acuta montana Jordan, 1894

References

acuta
Beetles described in 1801